Dhawalagiri may refer to:
 Mount Dhawalagiri
 Dhawalagiri Zone